Jared Sullivan is an American politician. He serves as a Democratic member for the Grafton 2nd district of the New Hampshire House of Representatives.

Life and career 
Sullivan attended Montana State University.

In November 2022, Sullivan defeated Cathy Qi in the general election for the Grafton 2nd district of the New Hampshire House of Representatives, winning 64 percent of the votes. He assumed office in December 2022.

References 

Living people
Year of birth missing (living people)
Place of birth missing (living people)
Democratic Party members of the New Hampshire House of Representatives
21st-century American politicians
Montana State University alumni